Terry O'Flaherty is a former Mayor of Galway.

A daughter of a previous Mayor, Bridie O'Flaherty, she was guest at the 2004 St. Patrick's Day Parade in Seattle. She was first elected to Galway City Council in 1999 as a member of the Progressive Democrats. She resigned from the party on 21 October 2008 over the issue of means testing medical cards for over 70s introduced in that years Budget and was re-elected as an Independent in 2009 in the Galway City East local electoral area.

It was during her first term of office that the notable sculpture of Oscar Wilde and Eduard Wilde was unveiled in the city.

References

External links
Listing of previous Mayors of Galway

Politicians from County Galway
Mayors of Galway
Year of birth missing (living people)
Progressive Democrats politicians
Living people
Local councillors in Galway (city)